Partition of Bengal may refer to the partition of the Bengal region on two occasions:
Partition of Bengal (1905), a reorganization within India
Partition of Bengal (1947), a consequence of Partition of India